Paul Lankford (born  June 15, 1958 in New York, New York) is a former American professional football player. He was a  cornerback who played ten seasons in the National Football League. He played in two Super Bowls for the Miami Dolphins. He played collegiately at Penn State and is the father of former Illinois wide receiver Ryan Lankford, who signed with the Dolphins in 2014.

References

External links
Paul Lankford on Pro Football Reference 

1958 births 
Living people
Players of American football from New York City
American football cornerbacks
Penn State Nittany Lions football players
Miami Dolphins players